Jinpu railway station, formerly known as Puwan railway station, is a railway station on the Harbin–Dalian high-speed railway in Jinzhou District, Dalian, Liaoning, China. It opened along with the Harbin–Dalian high-speed railway on 1 December 2012.

References

Railway stations in Liaoning
Railway stations in China opened in 2012